HSL Logistik GmbH. is a privately-owned German train-operating company based in Hamburg, Germany.

History
HSL Logistik was founded in 2003 as a private company offering trained staff to rail operators. In 2004 the company received a license to operate freight and passenger trains from the German Federal Railway Authority.

In 2010 Haiko Boettcher took over management of the company, having become a shareholder in 2007. Also in 2010 the company was awarded a license to operate trains in the Netherlands, and acquired and merged with Hamburg-based rail operator Rent a Train GmbH. In 2011 Haiko Boettcher became the 100% shareholder of the company.

Operations and services
HSL Logistik provides shunting services at terminals and ports in Bremen, Hamburg, Rostock and Seelze (Hanover), transportation by train, including path ordering, spot hire and one-off locomotive hire.

HSL also operates traffic in neighboring European countries, namely the Netherlands, Austria, Poland and the Czech Republic. HSL Logistik GmbH is represented by independent subsidiaries in each of these countries.

Starting early 2017, HSL operated cargo services in Belgium through its Polish subsidiary HSL Polska.

Safety issues
On 12 April 2017, the Dutch Railway Authority revoked the company's operations license with immediate effect due to significant safety problems within the organization. It was the first time the authority had revoked such a licence.

Fleet
The company operates using the locomotives below. They used to operate with Vossloh G2000 diesel locomotives for mainline work, but these have now been returned. and diesel and electric Prima types.

References

External links
, official website

Private railway companies of Germany
Rail freight transport in Germany